The Changhe Freedom M70 is an MPV manufactured by Changhe, a sub-brand of BAIC.

Overview

The Changhe Freedom M70 was revealed in 2016 with prices ranging from 54,900 yuan to 64,900 yuan, while the Changhe Freedom M70 was available on the market from March 2017.

Specifications
The Changhe Freedom M70 is powered by a 1.5-litre engine mated t a 5-speed manual transmission. It is available with 5-, 7- and 8-seater configurations.

References

External links

Cars of China
Minivans
2010s cars
BAIC Group vehicles